The Aichi E13A (Allied reporting name: "Jake") was a long-range reconnaissance seaplane used by the Imperial Japanese Navy (IJN) from 1941 to 1945. Numerically the most important floatplane of the IJN, it could carry a crew of three and a bombload of 250 kg (550 lb). The Navy designation was "Navy Type Zero Reconnaissance Seaplane" (零式水上偵察機).

Operational history

In China, it operated from seaplane tenders and cruisers. Later, it was used as a scout for the Attack on Pearl Harbor, and was encountered in combat by the United States Navy during the Battles of Coral Sea and Midway. It was in service throughout the conflict, for coastal patrols, strikes against navigation, liaison, officer transports, castaway rescues, and other missions, along with some kamikaze missions in the last days of war.

One Aichi E13A was operated by Nazi Germany alongside two Arado Ar 196s out of the base at Penang. The three aircraft formed the East Asia Naval Special Service to assist the German Monsun Gruppe as well as local Japanese naval operations.

Eight examples were operated by the French Navy Air Force during the First Indochina War from 1945-1947, while others were believed to be operated by the Naval Air Arm of the Royal Thai Navy before the war. One example captured by New Zealand forces was flown by RNZAF personnel in theatre, but was not repaired after a float was damaged and subsequently sank.

Variants

E13A1
Prototypes and first production model, later designated Model 11.
E13A1-K
Trainer version with dual controls
E13A1a
Redesigned floats, improved radio equipment
E13A1a-S
Night-flying conversion
E13A1b
As E13A1a, with Air-Surface radar
E13A1b-S
Night-flying conversion of above
E13A1c
Anti-surface vessel version equipped with two downward-firing belly-mounted 20 mm Type 99 Mark II cannons in addition to bombs or depth charges

Production
Constructed by Aichi Tokei Denki KK:133
Constructed by Watanabe (Kyushu Hikoki KK):1,237
Constructed by Dai-Juichi Kaigun Kokusho: 48

Operators

French Navy
Aeronavale
French Air Force - Captured Japanese aircraft.

Imperial Japanese Navy
Imperial Japanese Navy Air Service

Kriegsmarine

Royal Thai Navy

People's Liberation Army Air Force - surplus or derelict Japanese aircraft

Surviving aircraft
The wrecks of a number of sunken aircraft are recorded. The wreckage of one aircraft is located on-land at an abandoned seaplane base at Lenger Island, off Pohnpei in the Federated States of Micronesia.

One E13A was raised from where it sank and is displayed at the Kakamigahara Aerospace Museum, Kakamigahara, Gifu, Japan. However, it is reportedly in poor condition, lacking its engine, tail floats and one wing.

Specifications (E13A1)

See also

References

Notes

Bibliography
 Dorr, Robert E. and Chris Bishop. Vietnam Air War Debrief. London: Aerospace Publishing, 1996. .
 Francillon, René J. Japanese Aircraft of the Pacific War. London: Putnam & Company, 1979 (2nd edition). .

External links

AirToAirCombat.com: Aichi E13A Jake

E13A
1940s Japanese military reconnaissance aircraft
Floatplanes
Single-engined tractor aircraft
Low-wing aircraft
Aircraft first flown in 1939